Gamal Abdel Nasser Museum is a biographical  museum in Cairo, Egypt.

It is named after and about Gamal Abdel Nasser (1918—1970), the former President of Egypt (1956—1970). The museum occupies Nasser's former home in Heliopolis, where he lived with his family during his 18 years in power.

The museum opened in October 2016.

References

Museums in Cairo
Biographical museums in Egypt
History museums in Egypt
Gamal Abdel Nasser